The Church of Tau is a 14th-century, deconsecrated Roman Catholic church located on Corso Silvano Fedi #28 in Pistoia, region of Tuscany, Italy. It is located adjacent to Piazza Garibaldi, and across the street from the church of San Domenico.

It was originally dedicated to St Anthony Abbot, and established along with the monastery by monks of the Canons Regular of St Anthony of Vienne. The church and adjacent monastery now houses the Fondazione Marino Marini, and exhibits some of the 20th-century sculptor's work in the church. The walls of the church were frescoed in 1372 by Niccolò di Tommaso and Antonio Vite.

Gallery

References

Roman Catholic churches in Pistoia
14th-century Roman Catholic church buildings in Italy
Gothic architecture in Tuscany